The Mendips or Mendip Hills are a group of hills in Somerset, England.

Mendips may also refer to:
251 Menlove Avenue or Mendips, John Lennon's childhood home
Mendips Raceway, a motorsport venue in the Mendip Hills in Somerset, England

See also 
Mendip (disambiguation)